Prime Minister's Cup may refer to:

Laotian Prime Minister's Cup, a football competition in Laos
Prime Minister's Cup, a football competition in Turkey
Başbakanlık Kupası (Northern Cyprus), a tournament of the Cyprus Turkish Football Federation
Prime Minister Cup (Go), a Go tournament in Japan
Prime Minister's Cup (Sōridaijin-hai), a ceremonial cup given to the makuuchi champion in sumo
Prime Minister Cup (Nepal), a cricket competition in Nepal
Prime Minister's Cup (AFL), an individual match award in the Australian Football League
Prime Minister's Cup, a trophy awarded to the winner of the Japan Professional Sports Grand Prize

See also
 Prime Minister's Trophy, awarded to the winner of the Bahamas Bowl in college football
President's Cup (disambiguation)
President's Trophy (disambiguation)